The 2002 Australian Formula Ford Championship was a CAMS sanctioned Australian motor racing title open to Formula Ford racing cars.  It was the tenth Australian Formula Ford Championship. The title was won by Jamie Whincup driving a Van Diemen RF 01 Ford.

Calendar

The championship was contested over an eight-round series with two races per round.

Points system
Championship points were awarded on a 20-16-14-12-10-8-6-4-2-1 basis to the top ten placegetters in each race. An additional point was awarded to the driver setting pole position at each round.

Results

Note: Australian Formula Ford regulations mandated the use of the Ford 1600cc "Kent" four cylinder engine.

References

External links
Formula Ford Australia
Whincup leads the field at Wakefield Park, formulaford.com.au via web.archive.org

Australian Formula Ford Championship seasons
Formula Ford